Bimal Kanti Ghosh (also spelt Bimalkanti; 5 April 1924 – 1 January 1998) was an Indian politician. He was elected to the Lok Sabha, the lower house of the Parliament of India from the Serampore constituency of West Bengal as a member of the Indian National Congress.

Kanti Ghosh died in Serampore on 1 January 1998, at the age of 73.

References

External links
 Official biographical sketch in Parliament of India website

1924 births
1998 deaths
Indian National Congress politicians
India MPs 1967–1970
India MPs 1984–1989